The  St. Bernulphusgilde  or  Guild of St. Bernulphus  was a Dutch Catholic secret society established on December 1, 1869. Its intention initially was to serve as a trade union and protect national traditions of old craftsmanship in religious art and church architecture. Information about the association's meetings, as well as trade information, was published in their magazine The Guild Book. The association was considered a guild and named after the 11th-century bishop of Utrecht, a passionate church builder named Bernold.

Establishment 
The association was established in Utrecht, founded by Gerard van Heukelum, at that time chaplain of St. Catherine's Cathedral in that city, from the idea of the Flemish St. Thomas Guild and St. Lucas Guild. Membership was originally open only to clergy, but the guild flourished when membership was extended to certain religious artists and architects. Although guild members worked mainly in the Netherlands in the Utrecht province, and to a lesser extent in other parts of the archdiocese, it played an important role in the construction and furnishing of churches throughout the Netherlands. Many well-known artists and craftsmen from the Rhineland were welcomed. The association was strict about conforming to particular requirements of style and obtained important jobs because of this.

The guild stayed active until the 1930s.

Style 
The prescribed style for church construction was a conservative variant of the Gothic Revival architecture that focused on indigenous varieties of the late Gothic period, particularly the Gothic Lower Rhine, and was done almost exclusively in brick. The so-called "Utrecht School" of the association contrasted with the much more progressive views of Pierre Cuypers, who was an honorary member but for whom Gothic Revival was just a starting point for innovation. The design of the Willibrord church in Utrecht is one of many that followed the concepts of the St. Bernulphus guild association and is one of its best-preserved examples. The first church both built and decorated according to the ideas of the guild was the St. Nicolas in Jutphaas, of which Van Heukelum was appointed priest, in 1874.

Founder Van Heukelum's collection of art from medieval times served as examples to form a museum in 1872. It was available to the public. This museum in 1882 was elevated to the Archbishop's Museum, the predecessor of the current Museum Catharijneconvent.

Members 
Gerard Brom (1831–1882), silversmith
Jan Brom, silversmith, son of Gerard Brom
 (1841–1904), stained-glass artist
Albert Kniep, metalworker
Johannes Franciscus Augustinus Lindsen (1939–1910), antiquarian. 
Chrétien Lindsen (1840–1898), painter 
, organ builder
Friedrich Wilhelm Mengelberg (1837–1919), sculptor
 (1867–1924), sculptor and stained-glass artist, son of Friedrich Wilhelm Mangelberg
Martinus Christiaan Schenk (1833–1911), painter
J. Schillemans
Alfred Tepe, architect 
P. W. van der Weijer, publisher

Attitude 

St. Bernulphus guild association was run more like a fraternity than a scholarly society. This characterization was typified by discussions being postponed due to copious dinners that overran their allotted time. Their meetings usually ended up in fraternal jovial feasting. The guild association even had its own song that was sung by the members. The song lyrics were written by Herman Schaepman (1844-1903), a priest.

References

Sources 

Cortjaens, Wolfgang, Historism and cultural identity in the Rhine-Meuse region: tensions between nationalism and regionalism in the nineteenth century, Leuven University Press, 2008,

Further reading 
Secret Societies - The Complete Guide to Histories, Rites, and Rituals

Secret societies
Guilds in the Netherlands
Trade unions in the Netherlands
1869 establishments in the Netherlands
Trade unions established in 1869